The XIV Constitutional Government of São Tomé and Príncipe (Portuguese: XIV Governo Constitucional de São Tomé e Príncipe) was a Government of São Tomé and Príncipe. It was established on 14 August 2010 and it was disestablished on 5 December 2012.

References

2010 establishments in São Tomé and Príncipe
Cabinets established in 2010
Government of São Tomé and Príncipe
Cabinets disestablished in 2012